The Indonesia Channel is an international English-language TV channel based in Jakarta, Indonesia, the channel is run by an international team of broadcast professionals, acquiring and producing content for global distribution. 

The programming lineup blends hot entertainment programs with compelling news and talk shows.

Launched in June 2014, the network airs news programs, lifestyle programs, talk show programs, food programs, travel programs, sports programs, TV dramas under Drama Hour, and films under Indocinema. 

The Indonesia Channel is privately funded and the channel is owned by PT Melia Media International.

Hosts
 Dalton Tanonaka
 Louisa Kusnandar
 Prisma Kinanti
 Lorraine Hahn
 ASYIFA LATIEF
 Jamie Aditya
 Yenny Wahid
 Jemima Tumewu
 Janice Hermijanto

Programs
 Hot Indonesia
 ASEAN Today
 I-Pop Playlist
 Foodiepedia
 Best of Bali
 Passion for Fashion
 Yoga Bliss
 Arti Sahabat
 The Home Team
 Newsbreak

Milestones
 June 2nd 2014: The Indonesia Channel is launched in both Jakarta, Indonesia and Hong Kong, this is the second Indonesian channel to launch on now TV.
 September 2nd 2014: The Indonesia Channel is launched on UPC in the Netherlands.
 October 1st 2014: The Indonesia Channel is launched on StarHub TV.
 March 14th 2015: Some programs distributed on MHz Networks
 October 2nd 2019: The Indonesia Channel was relaunched with new programs and lineup.
 April 20th 2021: The Indonesia Channel is launched on both ONIP TV and PZAZ TV.
 December 14th 2021: The Indonesia Channel is launched on MyRepublic channel 574.

References

External links
The Indonesia Channel (English)

Television stations in Indonesia
Mass media in Jakarta
International broadcasters
Television channels and stations established in 2014